Fret-King is a UK manufacturer of stringed instruments and musical accessories, originally conceived by guitar designer Trevor Wilkinson in the early 1990s. The company has manufactured a number of electric and bass guitars noted for their distinct appearance and non-traditional aesthetic.

Since 2008, the Fret-King brand has been owned by UK musical instrument distributors John Hornby Skewes and Co. Ltd. (JHS), and is based in Garforth, Leeds.

Fret-King has designed signature model guitars for a number of artists including Jerry Donahue, John Etheridge, Gordon Giltrap, John Verity, John Jorgenson, Elliott Randall and Danny Bryant.

Manic Street Preachers guitarist James Dean Bradfield is a notable proponent of Fret-King guitars, and regularly plays a red Ventura 60SSH live and in the studio. Other notable users of Fret-King branded guitars include Parker Lundgren, Gavin Coulson of Oliver/Dawson Saxon, Jeff Brown of Cats In Space and Andrew Pipe of The Mentulls.

Trevor Wilkinson parted ways with JHS in 2018.

See also 
 Vintage Guitars

References

Guitar manufacturing companies
Companies established in the 1990s
Musical instrument manufacturing companies of the United Kingdom
Manufacturing companies based in Leeds